Esko is a Finnish masculine given name and surname.

Given name
People with the given name include:

 Esko Aho (born 1954), former Prime Minister of Finland
 Esko Ahonen (born 1955), Finnish politician
 Esko Almgren (born 1932), Finnish politician
 Esko Elstelä (1931–2007), Finnish screenwriter and film director
 Esko Hamilo (born 1945), Finnish diplomat
 Esko Hillebrandt (born 1962), Finnish rower
 Esko Järvinen (1907–1976), Finnish skier
 Esko Jussila (born 1934), Finnish skier
 Esko Kaonpää (1942–2002), Finnish ice hockey player
 Esko Karhunen (1928–2016), Finnish basketball player
 Esko Karu (1946–2003), Canadian skier
 Esko Kiviranta (born 1950), Finnish politician
 Esko Kovero (born 1958), Finnish actor
 Esko Kunnamo (1929–2014), Finnish diplomat
 Esko Laine (born 1961), Finnish double-bassist and educator
 Esko Lähtevänoja (born 1953), Finnish skier
 Esko Luostarinen (born 1935), Finnish ice hockey player
 Esko Lyytikkä (1929–1997), Finnish rower
 Esko Malm (born 1940), Finnish footballer
 Esko Marttinen (born 1938), Finnish biathlete
 Esko Mikkola (born 1975), Finnish javelin thrower
 Esko Nevalainen (1925–2008), Finnish cinematographer
 Esko Niemi (1934–2013), Finnish ice hockey player
 Esko Nikkari (1938–2006), Finnish actor
 Esko Niskanen (1928–2013), Finnish politician
 Esko Rajakoski (1934–2002), Finnish diplomat
 Esko Ranta (born 1947), Finnish footballer
 Esko Rautionaho (born 1950), Finnish ski jumper
 Esko Rechardt (born 1958), Finnish sport sailor
 Esko Rekomaa (1932–1985), Finnish ice hockey player
 Esko Saira (born 1938), Finnish biathlete
 Esko Salminen (born 1940), Finnish actor
 Esko Salminen (field hockey) (1920–1998), Finnish field hockey player
 Esko Seppänen (born 1946), Finnish politician
 Esko Silvennoinen (1931–2020), Finnish field hockey player
 Esko Tie (1928–2002), Finnish ice hockey player
 Esko Tommola (1930–2008), Finnish newsreader
 Esko Töyri (1915-1992), Finnish cinematographer and film director
 Esko Ukkonen (born 1950), Finnish computer scientist
 Esko Vaartela (1927–1983), Finnish diplomat
 Esko Valkama (1924–2007), Finnish footballer
 Esko Valtaoja (born 1951), Finnish astronomer and writer

Surname 
People with the surname include:
 Edward Esko (1950–2021), American macrobiotic diet advocate
 Jeffrey Esko, American biochemist
 Mikko Esko (born 1978), Finnish volleyball player

Finnish masculine given names
Finnish-language surnames